Walter Hernández (born July 5, 1965 in Comandante Nicanor Otamendi, Buenos Aires) is an Argentine former racing driver. He won the Turismo Carretera championship in 1993.

External links
Driver DB Profile

1965 births
Sportspeople from Buenos Aires Province
Argentine racing drivers
Turismo Carretera drivers
TC 2000 Championship drivers
Living people
Formula Renault Argentina drivers